Aethes angustana is a moth of the family Tortricidae. It was described by James Brackenridge Clemens in 1860. It is known from North America, including Massachusetts, Ontario and Pennsylvania.

References

External links

Moth Photographers Group. Mississippi State University.
Bug Guide

angustana
Moths described in 1860
Moths of North America
Taxa named by James Brackenridge Clemens